Causse de Blandas is a limestone karst plateau in the south of the Massif Central in the Gard department, in southern France.

Geography
The communes of causse de Blandas are:
Blandas
Montdardier
Rogues
Saint-Laurent-le-Minier
Gorniès

See also
 Causses
 cirque de Navacelles
 Vis river

Landforms of Gard
Plateaus of Metropolitan France